Hydnocystis is a genus of truffle-like fungi in the family Pyronemataceae.

References

Pyronemataceae
Truffles (fungi)
Pezizales genera
Taxa named by Edmond Tulasne